Memory storage may refer to:
 Psychological term for storage (memory) of mental states
 Computer hardware that acts as a data storage device
 Computer process for holding data (computer data storage)